Nadège Cliton (born 18 June 1978) is a French former medley swimmer who competed in the 1996 Summer Olympics.

References

1978 births
Living people
French female medley swimmers
Olympic swimmers of France
Swimmers at the 1996 Summer Olympics
Mediterranean Games medalists in swimming
Mediterranean Games gold medalists for France
Swimmers at the 1993 Mediterranean Games
Swimmers at the 1997 Mediterranean Games
20th-century French women
21st-century French women